Quantitative history is a method of historical research that uses quantitative, statistical and computer resources. It is considered a type of the social science history and has four major journals: Historical Methods (1967– ), Journal of Interdisciplinary History (1968– ), the Social Science History (1976– ), and Cliodynamics: The Journal of Quantitative History and Cultural Evolution (2010– ).

Quantitative historians use databases as their main sources of information. Large quantities of economic and demographic data are available in print format which can be converted into computer databases. The largest repository presently is the Inter-university Consortium for Political and Social Research (ICPSR) of the University of Michigan, which provides access to an extensive collection of downloadable political and social data for the United States and the world.

Data bases 

Content analysis is a technique borrowed from journalism research whereby newspapers, magazines or similar sources are coded numerically according to a standardized list of topics.

Economic history 

Economic historians use major data sets, especially those collected by governments since the 1920s. Historians of slavery have used census data, sales receipts and price information to reconstruct the economic history of slavery.

Political history 

Quantifiers study topics like voting behavior of groups in elections, the roll call behavior of legislators, public opinion distribution, and the occurrence rate of wars and legislation.  Collective biography uses standardized information for a large group to deduce patterns of thought and behavior.

Social history 

Social historians using quantitative methods (sometimes termed "new social historians", as they were "new" during the 1960s) use census data and other data sets to study entire populations. Topics include demographic issues such as population growth rates, rates of birth, death, marriage and disease, occupational and education distributions, genealogy and migrations and population changes.

A challenging technique is that of associating occurrences of the name of a given person ("nominal record linkage") whose information appears in multiple sources such as censuses, city directories, employment files and voting registration lists.

Cliodynamics is the application of scientific method to the study of history, combining insights from cultural evolution, macrosociology, and economic history/cliometrics to produce and analyse large quantitative datasets and identify general principles about the evolutionary dynamics and functioning of historical societies.

Topics 

During 2007–2008, the five most viewed articles in Social Science History were:

  S. J. Kleinberg, "Children's and Mothers' Wage Labor in Three Eastern U.S. Cities, 1880-1920"  Mar 01, 2005; 29: 45-76.
  Ted L. Gragson, Paul V. Bolstad, "A Local Analysis of Early-Eighteenth-Century Cherokee Settlement,"   Sep 01, 2007; 31: 435-468.
  Helen Boritch, "The Criminal Class Revisited: Recidivism and Punishment in Ontario, 1871-1920,"   Mar 01, 2005; 29: 137-170.
  Javier Silvestre, "Temporary Internal Migrations in Spain, 1860-1930," Dec 01, 2007; 31: 539-574.
  Eric W. Sager, "The Transformation of the Canadian Domestic Servant, 1871-1931"  Dec 01, 2007; 31: 509-537.

See also 

 Cliodynamics
 Demographic history
 Digital history
 H-Net
 Historiometrics
 New economic history

References

Bibliography 

 Aydelotte, William O., Allan G. Bogue, and Robert William Fogel, eds. The Dimensions of Quantitative Research in History  (Princeton University Press, 1972). Essays by leading pioneers with case studies in the social, political, and economic development of the United States, France, and Great Britain.
 Clubb, Jerome M., Erik W. Austin, and Gordon W. Kirk, Jr. The Process of Historical Inquiry: Everyday Lives of Working Americans (Columbia University Press, 1989). Uses case study of American textile workers in 1888-90
 Clubb, J. M., and E. K. Scheuch (eds.) Historical Sozial Research: The Use of Historical and Process-Produced Data, Stuttgart 1980, European emphasis

 Crymble, Adam Technology and the Historian: Transformations in the Digital Age (University of Illinois Press, 2021)

 Dollar, Charles, and Richard Jensen. Historian's Guide to Statistics, (Holt, 1971; Krieger 1973); detailed textbook of quantitative political and social history with bibliography
 Fogel, Robert William and G. R. Elton, Which Road to the Past: Two Views of History (Yale University Press, 1983).  Debate over merits.
 Haskins, Loren and Kirk Jeffrey. Understanding Quantitative History (M.I.T. Press, 1990). textbook
 Hollingsworth, T.H. Historical Demography. Hodder & , London 1969
 Hudson, Pat. History by Numbers: An Introduction to Quantitative Approaches (Arnold, 2000).  Comprehensive textbook; examples drawn mainly from British sources.
 Jarausch, Konrad H. and Kenneth A. Hardy, Quantitative Methods for Historians: A Guide to Research, Data, and Statistics (University of North Carolina Press, 1991). textbook
 Kousser, J.M.,  "History QUASSHed: quantitative social scientific history." American Behavioral Scientist 23(1980), p. 885-904
 Lorwin, Val R. and. J. M. Price, ed. The Dimensions of the Past: Materials, Problems and Opportunities for Quantitative Work in History, Yale UP 1972
 Kimberly A. Neuendorf. The Content Analysis Guidebook (2002)
 Rowney, D.K., (ed.) Quantitative History: Selected Readings in the Quantitative Analysis of Historical Data, 1969
 Swierenga, Robert P., ed. Quantification in American History: Theory and Research (Atheneum, 1970). Early essays on methodology, and examples of political, economic, and social history.
 Wrigley, E.A. (ed.) Identifying People in the Past. Edward Arnold, 1973. Using demographic and census data

Other sources 

Grinin, L. 2007. Periodization of History: A theoretic-mathematical analysis. In: History & Mathematics: Analyzing and Modeling Global Development. Edited by Leonid Grinin, Victor C. de Munck, and Andrey Korotayev. Moscow: KomKniga, 2006. P.10-38. .
 Kimberly A. Neuendorf. (2002). The Content Analysis Guidebook. Los Angeles: Sage.
 Moyal, J.E. (1949) The distribution of wars in time. Journal of the Royal Statistical Society, 112, 446-458.
 Richardson, L. F. (1960). Statistics of deadly quarrels. Pacific Grove, CA: Boxwood Press.
 Silver, N. C. & Hittner, J. B. (1998). Guidebook of statistical software for the social and behavioral sciences. Boston, MA: Allyn & Bacon.
 Turchin, P., et al., eds. (2007). History & Mathematics: Historical Dynamics and Development of Complex Societies. Moscow: KomKniga. 
 
Wilkinson, D. (1980). Deadly Quarrels: Lewis F. Richardson and the Statistical Study of War. Berkeley, CA: University of California Press.
 Wright, Q. (1965). A Study of War. 2nd ed. Chicago: University of Chicago Press.

External links 
 Interuniversity Consortium for Political and Social Research (ICPSR) at the University of Michigan
 Quantitative History

Fields of history
Social science methodology
Quantitative research